Caudellia declivella is a species of snout moth in the genus Caudellia. It was described by Philipp Christoph Zeller in 1881, and is known from Panama and Colombia.

References

Moths described in 1881
Phycitinae